Joseph Reed Ingersoll (June 14, 1786 – February 20, 1868) was an American lawyer and statesman from Philadelphia, Pennsylvania. In 1835 he followed his father, Jared Ingersoll, and his older brother, Charles Jared Ingersoll, to represent Pennsylvania in the U.S. House.

Biography
He graduated from Princeton College in 1804.  He studied law with his father, was admitted to the bar and commenced practice in Philadelphia.  In 1825, Ingersoll was elected to the American Philosophical Society.

He was elected in 1834 as a Whig anti-Jacksonian candidate to the Twenty-fourth Congress.  He declined to be a candidate for renomination in 1836, serving 1835–1837.  He resumed the practice of law.

Ingersoll was elected as a Whig to the Twenty-seventh Congress to fill the vacancy caused by the resignation of John Sergeant.  He was reelected as a Whig to the Twenty-eighth, Twenty-ninth, and Thirtieth Congresses.  He declined to accept the nomination as a candidate for reelection in 1848.  In all, his second stay in office lasted from 1841 to 1849.

He was the chairman of the United States House Committee on the Judiciary during the Thirtieth Congress. He was an advocate for protection and a firm supporter of Henry Clay. One of his noted efforts in the House was a defense of Clay's tariff of 1842.

In 1852, President Millard Fillmore sent him to the United Kingdom as the U.S. Minister. He served about a year, and then retired to private life, devoting himself to literary pursuits. The degree of LL.D. was conferred on him by Lafayette and Bowdoin in 1836, and that of D.C.L. by Oxford in 1845.

He died in Philadelphia in 1868.  Interment in St. Peter's Protestant Episcopal Churchyard.

Works
He was a warm adherent of the Union, and at the time of the American Civil War prepared an essay entitled "Secession, a Folly and a Crime." He published a translation from the Latin of Roceus's (Francesco Rocco's) tracts "De Navibus et Naulo" and "De Assecuratione" (Philadelphia, 1809), and was the author of a Memoir of Samuel Breck (1863).

Notes

Sources

The Political Graveyard

Attribution

1786 births
1868 deaths
Politicians from Philadelphia
Ingersoll family
American people of English descent
Pennsylvania National Republicans
National Republican Party members of the United States House of Representatives
Whig Party members of the United States House of Representatives from Pennsylvania
Ambassadors of the United States to the United Kingdom
19th-century American diplomats
Princeton University alumni
19th-century American politicians
Lawyers from Philadelphia
Burials at St. Peter's churchyard, Philadelphia
19th-century American lawyers
19th-century American Episcopalians